Romeo Vermant (born 24 January 2004) is a Belgian professional footballer who plays as a forward for Belgian First Division B side Club NXT.

Club career
Vermant began his career at the youth academy of Club Brugge. On 22 January 2021, Vermant made his debut for Brugge's reserve side, Club NXT in the Belgian First Division B against Lierse. On 5 January 2022, he signed a professional contract with the club tying him until 2024.

Personal life
Vermant is the son of former Belgian international Sven Vermant. He was born in Gelsenkirchen, Germany when his father was playing for Schalke. His maternal grandfather Eric Van Vyve and great-grandfather Marcel Van Vye were also footballers for Club Brugge, making him a fourth generation footballer.

Career statistics

Club

References

External links
Profile at the Club Brugge website
ACFF Profile

2004 births
Living people
Sportspeople from Gelsenkirchen
Belgian footballers
Belgium youth international footballers
German footballers
German people of Belgian descent
Association football forwards
Club Brugge KV players
Challenger Pro League players